David Robert Sime Cumming from the University of Glasgow, Glasgow, UK, was named Fellow of the Institute of Electrical and Electronics Engineers (IEEE) in 2013 for contributions to integrated sensors and microsystem technology.

References 

Fellow Members of the IEEE
Scottish engineers
Academics of the University of Glasgow
Living people
Year of birth missing (living people)
Place of birth missing (living people)